FoodCrafters is a food travel show on the Cooking Channel hosted by Aida Mollenkamp. The show debuted on May 31, 2010 and is currently in its second season. It airs on Tuesday evenings on the Cooking Channel. FoodCrafters is produced for Cooking Channel by Citizen Pictures.

2010 American television series debuts